Tiny and Crew is a British pre-school series which aired on Tiny TCC. Tiny TCC was replaced in 1997 by Living TV's time slot Tiny Living where the show continued.

The Crew
Tiny was a huge yellow yeti (Known in the series as a Wigasaurus) Tiny had bright blue hair and was known for being larger the life. Tiny had a fixed age of just five years in the show. Tiny could not speak any English but as children would see he loved to learn new things about life. Tiny was joined by Dog, a puppet dog who loved nothing more than bones and playing hide and seek. Arabella, a puppet frog who would sometimes come across a little bossy but loved to try new things. The buddets, flowers who were known for their singing. It was not until the last series that they were seen to come alive. Tiny was joined by presenters Sarah Davison and Sophie Aldred (Sophie Socket.) Sophie left the show in 1996 to focus on presenting Words and Pictures for the BBC. And later to play the role of 'Mini the magician' in the ITV series Zzzap! She was replaced by Sarah. In 1999, the presenters role was dropped and a lifelike doll called Tammy (Tam) was introduced.

Aim of the show
Tiny and crew was a program that let children learn slowly by colours, shapes and numbers. Each episode lasted 20 minutes. The aim of the show was to find out what was under each coloured shape on the "playboard" by using a multi-coloured dice. That included real events in the outside world, telling stories, singing songs, the antics of Tiny Living presenters Dog and Arabella and trying to guess what was inside Tiny's bag. One of the main events often included the songs of some singing flowers "Budd and the Buddets".

Tiny TCC mascot 
The Character 'Tiny' was a mascot for The Children's Channel strand for younger children, 'Tiny TCC' in 1995 and 1996. He would feature alongside the presenter in between the strands pre-school shows. Clips from the series would also air throughout the block. When the strand moved to Living TV under the name Tiny Living, 'Dog' and 'Arabella' became the new mascots presenting in-vision presentation. In 2002, Arabella was dropped and Dog was joined by a male/female presenter. The presenters presenting the in-vision links included Emma Haley, Jo-Ann D‚Costa and Calum Callaghan.

VHS and DVD
The show was released on video in 2001.
Tiny and Crew:"New friend Tammy!" A music tape and plush toy was also issued in 1998 featuring Sophie Aldred.

References

External links
and crew at Toonhound.

https://www.kidobi.com/video-series-for-kids/Tiny-and-Crew/7cc1c64d-bf51-49c8-8ec5-c32b5dd7051b

1990s British children's television series
2000s British children's television series
1990s preschool education television series
2000s preschool education television series
1995 British television series debuts
2006 British television series endings
British children's fantasy television series
British preschool education television series
British television shows featuring puppetry
Television series by FilmFair